At Home with the Webbers is a 1993 television film directed by Brad Marlowe. Starring Jeffrey Tambor, Jennifer Tilly and David Arquette, the film centers on a typical American family who are cast in a reality TV series.

Cast
Jeffrey Tambor as Gerald Webber
Rita Taggart as Emma Webber
Jennifer Tilly as Miranda Webber
David Arquette as Johnny Webber
Brian Bloom as Josh
Jenny O'Hara as Mrs. Nelson
Darren Epton as Mike
Lesley Sachs as Billy
Gabriel Jarret as Thomas
Caroline Goodall as Karen James
Robby Benson as Roger Swade
Johnathon Schaech as Giampaolo
Alyssa Milano as Fan (cameo appearance)
Luke Perry as Garbage Guy (cameo appearance)

External links

1993 television films
1993 films
American independent films
1990s adventure films
1993 comedy-drama films
American comedy-drama television films
1990s English-language films
1990s American films